An Lão is a district (huyện) of Bình Định province in the South Central Coast region of Vietnam. As of 2003 the district had a population of 24,091. The district covers an area of 690 km². The district capital lies at An Lão.

The Battle of An Lão

The Battle of An Lão occurred in December 1964, ending as a tactical victory for the Việt Cộng, by wresting temporary control of the District Headquarters from the South Vietnamese forces.

References

Districts of Bình Định province